Only may refer to:

Music

Albums
 Only (album), by Tommy Emmanuel, 2000
 The Only, an EP by Dua Lipa, 2017
 The Only (EP), by The Boyz

Songs
 "Only" (Anthrax song), 1993
 "Only" (Nine Inch Nails song), 2005
 "Only" (Nicki Minaj song), 2014
 "Only" (Lee Hi song), 2021
 "The Only", by Static-X, 2003
 "Only", by Ass Ponys from Lohio, 2001
 "Only", by Fuse ODG, 2015
 "Only", by Imagine Dragons from Origins, 2018
 "Only", by NF from The Search, 2019
 "Only", by Sarah Vaughan from Sarah Slightly Classical, 1963
 "The Only", a song by Raiden featuring Irene, 2019

Other uses
 Only (film), a 2019 post-apocalyptic romance film
 Only (magazine), a 2000s Canadian news and entertainment magazine
 Only, Tennessee, US
 Jerry Only (born 1959), American punk rock bassist and singer

See also 
 
 
 Onley (disambiguation)